The 2022 specials of the British science fiction television programme Doctor Who are three additional episodes that follow the programme's thirteenth series, and were first announced in July 2021. The first special aired on 1 January 2022, with the additional specials airing on 17 April and 23 October. They {{#ifexpr:>1666555200|are|will be}} the final episodes to feature Jodie Whittaker as the Thirteenth Doctor and Chris Chibnall as showrunner. The specials also star Mandip Gill and John Bishop as the Doctor's travelling companions, Yasmin Khan and Dan Lewis, respectively.

The three specials were directed by Annetta Laufer, Haolu Wang and Jamie Magnus Stone respectively. Chibnall wrote all three specials, co-writing the second with Ella Road, a new contributor to the programme. The first two specials were filmed alongside the thirteenth series, and were completed by August 2021, with the third special having completed filming by that October.

Episodes

Casting

Jodie Whittaker {{#ifexpr:>1666555200|returned|returns}} as the Thirteenth Doctor for the three episodes, with the final special {{#ifexpr:>1666555200|being|set to be}} the last regular appearance of Whittaker in the role. Mandip Gill and John Bishop also return as Yasmin Khan and Dan Lewis, respectively. Aisling Bea and Adjani Salmon guest star in the New Year's special, "Eve of the Daleks", which also features Pauline McLynn. The second special, "Legend of the Sea Devils", features Crystal Yu as pirate queen Madame Ching, as well as Arthur Lee and Marlowe Chan-Reeves.

The final special, "The Power of the Doctor", features Jacob Anderson as Vinder and Jemma Redgrave as Kate Stewart, both of whom last appeared in the thirteenth series, as well as the Master, played by Sacha Dhawan, and Ashad, played by Patrick O'Kane, who were both last seen in the twelfth series. Former companions Tegan Jovanka and Ace, portrayed by Janet Fielding and Sophie Aldred, respectively, headline the special with Whittaker, Gill and Bishop. Mandip Gill confirmed her departure from the show in the final special on 3 May 2022.

Production

Development
On 29 July 2021, the BBC announced Jodie Whittaker and Chris Chibnall, who serves as executive producer and showrunner of the series, would both depart the series after a run of specials in 2022. Chibnall stated their departures were part of a "three series and out deal" he made with Whittaker prior to the eleventh series. The first two episodes were produced as part of the eight episodes ordered for the thirteenth series, and were already set to be held for 2022. A third feature-length special was later ordered to coincide with the centenary of the BBC and serve as Whittaker's regeneration episode. The BBC describes the final episode as an "epic blockbuster special". Executive producer Matt Strevens, who joined the series alongside Chibnall, is also {{#ifexpr:>1666555200|departed once production was|set to depart once production is}} complete. Chibnall later stated that post-production on the final special would continue into 2022 under the working title "the Centenary Special". Emily Lawrence, the visual effects editor, confirmed digital effects work was still ongoing in January 2022. Co-executive producer Nikki Wilson is also {{#ifexpr:>1666555200|left|set to}} leave after the BBC Centenary special, after being part of the show since "The Sontaran Stratagem" (2008), and its spin-off show, The Sarah Jane Adventures.

Writing
Chibnall continues as the head writer for the New Year's special episode "Eve of the Daleks", which features the Daleks in a loose trilogy that connects their appearances in the past New Year's specials, "Resolution" (2019) and "Revolution of the Daleks" (2021). Chibnall also wrote the following specials, co-writing the second, "Legend of the Sea Devils", with Ella Road. The second special features the return of the Sea Devils in their first appearance since Warriors of the Deep (1984). The Daleks and the Cybermen appear in the third and final special, "The Power of the Doctor".

Filming
The first two episodes were filmed in the same production run as the thirteenth series. Annetta Laufer directed the first special, and Haolu Wang directed the second. Filming for those specials concluded in August 2021. "The Power of the Doctor" was filmed throughout September 2021, directed by Jamie Magnus Stone, concluding on 13 October 2021.

Production blocks were arranged as follows:

Music
On 20 July 2022, composer Segun Akinola announced that he would not return after the final special, and that that episode would be his last.

Release

Promotion
Details of the New Year's Day special, "Eve of the Daleks", were revealed following the conclusion of "The Vanquishers", the finale of the thirteenth series. Details of "Legend of the Sea Devils" were likewise released after "Eve of the Daleks" concluded. Casting and details of the centenary special, without yet revealing the title or airdate, were again likewise released after "Legend of the Sea Devils" concluded. The title of the special, "The Power of the Doctor", was announced in Doctor Who Magazine on 14 September 2022.

As part of the promotion for "Legend of the Sea Devils", Scottish musician Nathan Evans was featured on the official Doctor Who YouTube channel, singing an adaptation of the sea ballad "Wellerman".

Broadcast

The first of the three specials aired on 1 January 2022 in the series' traditional New Year's Day time slot. The second special aired on 17 April 2022 as an Easter special, with the third and final special aired on 23 October 2022 as part of the BBC's Centenary celebrations.

Home media

Reception

Ratings

Critical reception

On Rotten Tomatoes, a review aggregator website, 82% of 11 critics gave "Eve of the Daleks" a positive review, with an average rating of 7.20 out of 10. The site's consensus reads "Doctor Who scales back and is all the better for it with a New Year's special that finds fresh notes within a self-contained yarn." On Rotten Tomatoes, 57% of 7 critics gave "Legend of the Sea Devils" a positive review, with an average rating of 4.90 out of 10. On Rotten Tomatoes, 100% of 10 critics gave "The Power of the Doctor" a positive review, with an average rating of 7.20 out of 10.

Soundtrack
On 18 November 2022, composer Segun Akinola announced that three individual soundtracks featuring selected pieces of score from each special would be digitally released on 2, 9, and 16 December 2022 respectively. A physical CD release containing all three soundtracks was released on 13 January 2023.

References

2022 British television seasons
Series 13a
Series 13a